Francis Hiorne FSA (1744 – 9 December 1789) was an architect and builder based in Warwick.

Background

He was the son of William Hiorne (c.1712 – 22 April 1776) and Mary Duncalfe.
He was elected a Fellow of the Society of Antiquaries on 7 April 1784.

Works

Galleries in St Mary’s Church, Warwick, 1769 reconstruction
St Mary’s Church, Tetbury, Glos. (1771–1781)
St Anne’s Church, Belfast (1772–1776)  demolished 1900. St. Anne's Cathedral now stands on the site.
St Bartholomew’s Church, Tardebigge 1776 – 1777
St Mary & St Giles Church, Stony Stratford 1777  
Hiorne’s Tower, Arundel Castle 1789 - 1790

He also influenced the design of Rosemary Street Presbyterian Church, Belfast, erected in 1783.

References

18th-century English architects
1744 births
1789 deaths
Fellows of the Society of Antiquaries of London
Architects from Warwickshire